Naranjo is a district of the Naranjo canton, in the Alajuela province of Costa Rica.

Geography 
Naranjo has an area of  km² and an elevation of  metres. It is in the Central Valley (Valle Central), 31 kilometers northwest of the provincial capital city of Alajuela, and 47 kilometers from the national capital city of San Jose. It is also in close proximity to Ciudad Quesada, the Northern Lowlands, Monteverde, Guanacaste, and Arenal.

Demographics 

For the 2011 census, Naranjo had a population of  inhabitants.

Transportation

Road transportation 
The district is covered by the following road routes:
 National Route 118
 National Route 141
 National Route 148
 National Route 706
 National Route 709
 National Route 715
 National Route 725

References 

Districts of Alajuela Province
Populated places in Alajuela Province